The 1980–81 DFB-Pokal was the 38th season of the annual German football cup competition. It began on 27 August 1980 and ended on 2 May 1981. In the final, FC Kaiserslautern was defeated by Eintracht Frankfurt (3–1) who were awarded the trophy for the third time. Despite losing in the quarter-finals, Hamburger SV set an all-time record by scoring 36 goals in the competition. Fortuna Düsseldorf set an all-time record of 18 consecutive cup-match victories since 1978, despite losing in the quarter-finals.

Matches

First round

Replays

Second round

Replays

Third round

Replay

Round of 16

Quarter-finals

Semi-finals

Final

References

External links
 Official site of the DFB 
 Kicker.de 

1980-81
1980–81 in German football cups